Trenton Edward Ashby (born October 9, 1972) is a Texas politician who currently represents district 57 of the Texas House of Representatives, which is composed of Angelina County, Houston County, Leon County, Madison County, San Augustine County, and Trinity County. Prior to being a state representative, Ashby was a local politician and business owner.

Early life
Trenton Edward Ashby was born on October 9, 1972 in Rusk County, Texas. He was raised in rural Rusk County on a dairy farm and diversified livestock operation. While growing up, Ashby was an elected leader in his local FFA and 4-H youth organizations. Graduating from Henderson High School, Ashby would go on to attend Texas A&M University where he was elected to the Student Senate, Senior Yell Leader, and Class Treasurer. He graduated from Texas A&M with a bachelor's degree in agricultural economics in 1996, and is still affiliated with Texas A&M through the Texas A&M Letterman's Association and Association of Former Students.

Political career

Ashby is a former president and member of the nonpartisan Lufkin Independent School District Board of Trustees; his tenure on the school board started in 2007 and ended in 2012. He served as president of the board in his final 2 years.

In 2012, Ashby entered the Republican primary to represent District 57 of the Texas House of Representatives, he was challenging incumbent representative Marva Beck. Ultimately, Ashby won the primary with 58.1% of the votes and was unopposed in the general election. He was sworn in to represent District 57 on January 8, 2013. He has been subsequently reelected, by large margins or was unopposed, in 2014, 2016, 2018, and 2020. District 57 serves Angelina County, Houston County, Leon County, Madison County, San Augustine County, and Trinity County.

In October 2020, Ashby filed for candidacy to be speaker of Texas House of Representatives. Ashby and Dade Phelan (R—Beaumont) were considered the primary contenders before Ashby backed out of the race, endorsing Geanie Morrison, after Phelan announced he had the votes to win the speakership. Ultimately, Phelan was elected the speaker.

Policies
KTRE characterized Ashby as a "conservative Republican." He has earned a 70% rating from the American Conservative Union.

Ashby has a record of being anti-abortion. He has supported and co-sponsored several bills restricting abortion access, including Texas House Bill 2 which banned abortion passed 20 weeks of gestation. This record has earned him a 100% rating from Texas Alliance for Life, a 60% from Texas Right to Life Committee, and a 0% from NARAL Pro-Choice Texas.

Personal life
Ashby is a resident of Lufkin, Texas with his wife Nickie and two sons, Garin and Grant. The Ashby family are active members of Harmony Hill Baptist Church. Additionally, he is active in several local non-profit organizations.

References

1972 births
Living people
21st-century American politicians
People from Lufkin, Texas
Texas A&M University alumni
Republican Party members of the Texas House of Representatives